Robert Kochiev (born March 16, 1966, Tskhinvali) is a Russian political figure and a deputy of the 6th and 8th State Dumas.
 
From 2007 to 2011, Kochiev was the deputy of the Parliament of the Republic of North Ossetia–Alania of the 4th convocation. In 2011, he was elected deputy of the 6th State Duma from the North Ossetia–Alania constituency. From 2017 to 2021, he was the deputy of the Parliament of the Republic of North Ossetia–Alania of the 6th convocation. Since September 2021, he has served as deputy of the 8th State Duma.

References
 

 

1966 births
Living people
Communist Party of the Russian Federation members
21st-century Russian politicians
Sixth convocation members of the State Duma (Russian Federation)
Eighth convocation members of the State Duma (Russian Federation)
People from Tskhinvali